Wael Saqqa (born 1956) is a Jordanian architect, and Chairman of the Jordan Engineering Association.

Career
The Jordan Engineers Association (JEA) established an "international commission" to help rebuild Gaza. 
A JEA delegation assessed the situation in Gaza.

He is on the Industry advisory board, of the German-Jordanian University.
He commented on Royal Dutch Shell planned extraction of oil from oil shale, and water supplies in Jordan.

He is Chairman of the Board of Almehanya Real Estate Investments.

Gaza flotilla
He was one of fifteen Jordanians who were passengers in the Gaza flotilla raid.

References

Jordanian architects
1956 births
Living people